The 2015 PRAFL season will be the 2nd season of the semi-pro Puerto Rican American football league. Officially, it is the 2nd season of the league. Cataño's American Football Field , Cataño is scheduled to host the 2nd Championship on May 31. The regular season will begin March 1 and end on May 8.

Standings

Note: GP = Games Played, W = Wins, L = Losses, T = Ties, PF = Points For, PA = Points Against, Pts = Points, F/R = Final Record (Including Playoffs)

''Teams in bold are in playoff positions.X – clinched playoff berth and plays first round. Y – clinched first/second place and first round bye to semi-finals

PRAFL playoffs

Playoff bracket

*-Team won in Overtime.

References

Puerto Rico American Football League seasons